Bhadra also known as Bhadau is the fifth month in the Bikram Sambat, the official Nepali calendar. This month coincides with August 17 to September 16 of the Western Calendar and is 31 days long.

Being mostly based on Hindu calendar, Nepali calendar's festival dates are flexible. Important events are:
around August 20: Bhadra 4, Gokarna Aunsi
around August 22: Bhadra 6, Dar Khane
around August 23: Bhadra 7, Haritalika Teej (Public Holiday for Women)
around August 24: Bhadra 8, Rishi Panchami
Bhadra 29, Children's Day)

Months in Nepali calendar

References
Nepali Date Today
Nepali Patro
Nepali Calendar with Festivals
New Nepali Calendar with festivals
Full Nepali Calendar with festivals
Nepali Calendar
Rajan Nepali date converter
Nepali Calendar
Nepali AD BS Date Converter
Nepali Date Converter

Nepali calendar